Nicky Hayden AMA Horizon Award, originally the AMA Horizon Award, is given annually to promising amateur riders in motorcycle racing. The inaugural AMA Horizon Award was presented to Nicky Hayden in 1997. In 2017 the award was renamed in honor of Nicky Hayden who was killed in a bicycling accident while training in Italy.
The award is presented annually to outstanding amateur riders in flat track, motocross and road racing.

References

American Motorcyclist Association